The A class was the Royal Navy's first class of British-designed submarines. Thirteen were built by Vickers at Barrow-in-Furness between 1902 and 1905 as an improvement on the US .

Design and construction
The first, A1 (ordered as Holland No. 6), was launched in July 1902, the last, A13, in April 1905.

Propulsion
A13 had an experimental  Vickers diesel engine, which proved to be unreliable.

Armaments
Armament was two  torpedo tubes with four torpedoes except for A1, which had 1 tube and 3 torpedoes.

Service history
This submarine class was plagued by numerous accidents and failures; almost every boat in the class (A1, A3, A4, A5, A7, and A8) was involved in some sort of accident over the course of their operational history. Many were fatal to the crew, and resulted in the decommissioning of the submarine. A1 was sunk off Portsmouth on 18 March 1904, in collision with the liner Berwick Castle, but raised and put back into service before finally being sunk as a naval gunnery target in 1911, followed in 1912 by A3. A7 was lost in Whitsand Bay in 1914 after diving into mud. A13 was laid up in 1914 due to engine unreliability.

The remainder were used during World War I for harbour defence, A2 and A4, A5 and A6 at Portsmouth, A8 and A9 at Devonport, and A10, A11 and A12 at Ardrossan. All survived the war and were converted to training in 1918 and sold in 1919–1920 except for A2, which was wrecked while awaiting disposal and finally sold in 1925.

Notes

References

External links

MaritimeQuest A Class Overview

A class submarine (1903), British